1995 in the Philippines details events of note that happened in the Philippines in the year 1995.

Incumbents

 President: Fidel Ramos (Lakas)
 Vice President: Joseph Estrada (NPC)
 Senate President:
Edgardo Angara (until August 28)
Neptali Gonzales (starting August 29)
 House Speaker: Jose de Venecia, Jr.
 Chief Justice: Andres Narvasa
 Philippine Congress:
9th Congress of the Philippines (until June 9)
10th Congress of the Philippines (starting July 24)

Events

January
 January 3 – An overloaded passenger bus crashes into a ravine in Echague, Isabela, killing at least 31 and injuring 36.
 January 6 – The police discovers what will be called Bojinka plot following a minor fire in an apartment building in Malate, Manila. The failed plot by Islamic militants, later reportedly linked to Al-Qaeda, has planned to assassinate Pope John Paul II in the country and to bomb U.S. airplanes later that month. Abdul Hakim Murad is arrested while Ramzi Yousef escapes. Murad would be extradited later to the United States.
 January 10–15 – World Youth Day 1995.
 January 12–16 – Second pastoral and state visit of Pope John Paul II in the country, coinciding with the 10th World Youth Day (WYD) and marking the fourth centenary of the Archdiocese of Manila and the Dioceses of Cebu, Caceres and Nueva Segovia. On Jan. 15, the Mass he led in Luneta, marking the end of WYD, draws a crowd of an estimated 4-million, the largest gathering at such papal Mass at that time.
 January 13 – A clash between the Philippine Army and some 120 Abu Sayyaf Group (ASG) members in Basilan results in the deaths of 42 extremists and 7 from the government troops; uncovers the terrorist group's existence for the first time since its establishment. Cirilito Sobejana, who led the team, would be awarded the Medal of Valor by the Armed Forces of the Philippines in 1996.
 January 21 – Pasig becomes a highly urbanized city in Metro Manila through ratification of Republic Act 7829 which was approved last December 8, 1994.

February
 Early February – The Philippine Navy discovers ships and structures being built, all by the Chinese, in Mischief Reef (Panganiban Reef) in the Spratly Archipelago (Kalayaan Island Group), South China Sea off Palawan; such occupation since the previous year causes the Government to take legal diplomatic actions against China and further tensions between two countries, especially in May when two Chinese ships will block that of the Department of National Defense attempting to approach the area.
 February 4 – Makati becomes a highly urbanized city through ratification of Republic Act 7854 which was approved last January 2.

March
 March 14 – In a highly publicized trial, the Pasig City Regional Trial Court (RTC), in its decision dated Mar. 11, convicts former Calauan, Laguna mayor Antonio Sanchez and six of his men for the deaths of two University of the Philippines Los Baños students in 1993, sentencing them to reclusión perpetua.
 March 17 – Flor Contemplacion, a household worker convicted of murder by the High Court of Singapore in 1994, is executed by hanging, causing diplomatic tensions between the Philippines and Singapore.

April
 April 4 – Some 200 heavily armed men, ASG members and Moro National Liberation Front renegades, raid Ipil town, then part of Zamboanga del Sur; set afire and rob the town center; kill 53 people, with 5 reportedly from the government. The bandits later take about 52 civilians hostage as they retreat; by mid-April, they would reportedly kill 20 of them in the municipalities of Siocon, R.T. Lim, and Tungawan; 32 would escape.
 April 7 – Following Ipil raid, battles between combined government forces and ASG gunmen in Siocon and R.T. Lim towns reportedly kill 12 extremists in both encounters, as well as three militiamen and 5 civilian hostages in Siocon.
 April 30 – President Ramos inaugurates the opening of the 722-million-peso Subic International Airport (formerly a United States military base). This indicates growth after the removal of military bases in the country.

May
 May 8:
 National legislative and local elections are held. Winning the most seats in the House of Representatives is the administration party Lakas–NUCD–UMDP, in the Senate is their national coalition with the oppositionist LDP.
 Majority of voters in Kalinga-Apayao ratified in a plebiscite RA 7878, signed on Feb. 14, converting the sub-provinces into new provinces of Kalinga (its capital will be Tabuk) and Apayao (new capital will be Kabugao).
 Muntinlupa becomes a highly urbanized city in Metro Manila through ratification of RA 7926 which was approved last March 1.
 May 16 – Overloaded inter-island ferry M/V Viva Antipolo VII catches fire and sinks in Tayabas Bay while approaching the port of Lucena; as of May 20, seventy passengers are killed, 52 others are reported missing.
 May 18 – Eleven Kuratong Baleleng crime syndicate members are killed in Quezon City in a reported summary execution by the police. Two more members are also found dead separately in Pasig City and Laguna. On Nov. 2, multiple murder charges will be filed by Ombudsman Aniano Desierto before the Sandiganbayan against then P/Chief Supt. Panfilo Lacson and 26 other Philippine National Police officers implicated in the Quezon City incident; however, in 2003, the city court would dismiss the case, to be further affirmed twice by the Supreme Court.

June
 June 7 – Intercountry Adoption Act (RA 8043) is enacted, allowing Filipino children to be adopted by foreigners if cannot be adopted by qualified Filipinos; strengthening protection against the sale and trafficking abroad.
 June 20 – Majority of voters reject in a plebiscite RA 7891, which has signed on Feb. 20, seeking division of the province of Isabela into proposed Isabela del Norte and Isabela del Sur.
 June 27 – Supreme Court orders permanent cease of operations of jai alai frontons in the country. It has decided with finality that the sport is illegal following opposition from the government.

July
 July 17 – The Philippines signs The Hague Convention on Protection of Children and Co-operation in Respect of Intercountry Adoption, which would be ratified and enforced the following year.
 July 28 – The Makati City RTC convicts former P/Col. Reynaldo Berroya and two others for the 1993 abduction of a Taiwanese businessman, and sentences them to life imprisonment. The ruling would be overturned by the Supreme Court in 1997.

August
 August 3 – The National Bureau of Investigation (NBI) arrests a Reform the Armed Forces Movement (RAM) member, former Sgt. Filomeno Maligaya, a co-conspirator in the 1986 killing of trade union leader Rolando Olalia and his driver. The RAM will be later cleared by the NBI shortly after the case is reopened. By late 2021, Maligaya is among the nine of 13 RAM members, charged in 1998 with the double murders, still at large.
 August 10 – Department of Justice files charges of rape and murder against eight sons of prominent families, including Hubert Webb, identified by star witness Jessica Alfaro, along with a former policeman, all accused in the deaths of three Vizconde family members in 1991. The case has reopened upon appearance and confession of Alfaro; trial will begin later in the Parañaque RTC.
 August 25 – Movie star Robin Padilla surrenders to police in Camarines Norte after four weeks in hiding as the Court of Appeals has upheld in July the 1994 conviction by a RTC for illegal possession of firearms, ordering him to begin serving the prison sentence. He would be released after being given conditional pardon by then Pres. Ramos; would be given absolute pardon by Pres. Duterte in 2016.
 Late August – Seventeen of the Senators vote to declare the Senate Presidency vacant, removing Sen. Edgardo Angara; Sen. Neptali Gonzales is elected later as replacement.

September
 September 6 – Apparent explosions trigger collapse of crater wall of Mt. Parker in T'boli, South Cotabato, overflowing Lake Maughan atop, causing what would be the worst floods in central Mindanao area affecting mostly tribal communities; by Sept. 12, reported deaths are at least 70 while 125 are missing, with damages worth ₱346-million.
 September 16 – An Emirates Islamic court sentences to death Sarah Balabagan, a household worker who has convicted of murder by another court in June 26 for killing her employer in self-defense in 1994, reversing the earlier imposed prison sentence. Following protests, in the third trial in October, an appeal court will reduce the punishment. She would return in the country in 1996.
 September 30 – Tropical Storm Sybil (Mameng) causes destruction in 32 provinces within 8 regions, especially in Central Luzon wherein lahar flows and floods occur in some parts of Pampanga; also affects Metro Manila and those in Southern Tagalog, most of the Visayas, and the provinces of Pangasinan, Albay and Bukidnon. It results in ₱3.17-billion worth of damages and 116 deaths.
 September – Nationwide inflation rate increases to 11.8%, the highest in 45 months, which has caused by rice and sugar crises.

October
 October 1 – In what will be the Mt. Pinatubo's worst lahar calamity since its eruption, rainfall during Tropical Storm Mameng causes lahars washing down from the volcano's slopes to the Pasig-Potrero River and its tributaries including the Gugu Creek, quickly burying the entire barangay Cabalantian in Bacolor, Pampanga. As of Oct. 7, 100 are reported dead and 252 missing, although fatalities are claimed to be probably more than a thousand. Thousands of houses in the area and 4 other barangays are buried into deposits about 9 meters deep; lahar flows also bury parts of San Fernando.
 October 13 – The Government signs a peace agreement with rebels of the Reform the Armed Forces Movement (RAM-SFP-YOU) at Camp Aguinaldo, formally ending the latter's seven-year revolt that occurred mostly in the time of the previous administration.
 October 19 – Opening of Enchanted Kingdom theme park.
 October 24
 The last total solar eclipse of the century is witnessed mostly in Tawi-Tawi, lasts for more than two minutes.
 Series of tropical disturbances begin with tropical depression Oniang, Oct. 24, passing over Luzon and causing floods in Bulacan and renewed lahar flows in Central Luzon. Tropical Storm Zack (Pepang), from Oct. 28 to 29, batters Visayas and Palawan, triggering massive floods; results in 265 deaths and ₱424-million worth of damages.

November
 November 2–3 – The most destructive of the series of tropical cyclones, Super Typhoon Angela (Rosing) rampages across southern Luzon with strong winds; devastates half of the country's regions including Bicol Region, the hardest hit,  as well as the mainland part of the Southern Tagalog Region, Metro Manila, and Bataan. Final data reports 936 deaths and ₱10.829-billion worth of damages.
 November 14 – The Court of Appeals reverses the 1992 libel conviction by the Manila RTC and acquits The Philippine Star publisher Maximo Soliven and the late journalist Luis Beltran, charged in connection with the latter's comments about Pres. Cojuangco–Aquino after a 1987 coup attempt.
 November 16 – Supreme Court denies with finality the motion for reconsideration filed by Kilosbayan, Inc. questioning an agreement between Philippine Charity Sweepstakes Office and Philippine Gaming Management Corporation on the on-line lottery operations, thus legalizing lotto.
 November 27 – The construction of the $1.15-billion Skyway project was initiated, the biggest infrastructure project in the country that was intended to ease the flow of traffic in Metro Manila.

December
 December 11 – Communist hit squad Alex Boncayao Brigade (ABB) perpetrates three separate ambushes targeting prominent Chinese-Filipino businessmen, killing four people including industrialist Leonardo Ty and his driver in Quezon City, as well as a Singaporean child. In 2004, two suspected ABB members masterminding the murder of Ty would be convicted by a city RTC.
 December 13 – A fire at inter-island passenger ferry M/V Kimelody Cristy near Fortune Island off Batangas leaves 24 people killed, 13 more are missing.
 December 16–17 – Seven suspected Pakistani terrorists are arrested in Bulacan and Manila; are later charged with plotting to disrupt the 1996 APEC Summit. Two others would surrender later at the Philippine National Police headquarters in Quezon City.
 December 29–30 – Fifteen individuals said to be part of Pakistan-based radical group Mahajar Qumi Movement are arrested in separate police raids in their safehouses in Manila. By year-end, 29 suspected foreign terrorists have been arrested in the country.

Holidays

As per Executive Order No. 292, chapter 7 section 26, the following are regular holidays and special days, approved on July 25, 1987. Note that in the list, holidays in bold are "regular holidays" and those in italics are "nationwide special days".

 January 1 – New Year's Day
 April 9 – Araw ng Kagitingan (Day of Valor)
 April 13 – Maundy Thursday
 April 14 – Good Friday
 May 1 – Labor Day
 June 12 – Independence Day 
 August 27 – National Heroes Day
 November 1 –  All Saints Day
 November 30 – Bonifacio Day
 December 25 – Christmas Day
 December 30 – Rizal Day
 December 31 – Last Day of the Year

In addition, several other places observe local holidays, such as the foundation of their town. These are also "special days."

Television

Sports
 November 17–21 – 1995 World Taekwondo Championships is held in Manila, Philippines
 December 9–21 – The Philippines participates in the 1995 Southeast Asian Games

Concerts
 February 26 – Pearl Jam Vitalogy Tour: Folk Arts Theater, Pasay
 March 3 – Janet Jackson Janet World Tour: Folk Arts Theater, Pasay
 June 2–3 – La Toya Jackson live at the Music Museum, San Juan, Metro Manila

Births
 January 4:
 Ara Galang, volleyball player
 Joshua Colet, actor, model
 January 5:
 Joyce Ching, actress
 Lexi Fernandez, actress
 Chang Hermoso, singer
 January 26 – Coleen Perez, actress
 February 3 – Kim Domingo, actress, TV commercial and model
 February 20 – Mccoy de Leon, actor and member of Hashtags
 February 23:
 Dave Bornea, actor
 Beatrice Gomez, beauty queen 
 February 28 – Lovely Lyn Esguerra, actress
 March 3 – Maine Mendoza, YouTube sensation, actress, comedian, and host
 March 16 – Shy Carlos, actress
 March 19:
 Julia Montes, actress
 Fumiya Sankai, actor and housemate
 March 27 – Koreen Medina, actress and beauty queen 
 April 24 – Amani Aguinaldo, footballer
 April 25 – Arra San Agustin, actress
 April 26 – Daniel Padilla, actor and singer
 May 3 – Shaira Diaz, actress
 May 11 – Yassi Pressman, actress and dancer
 May 19 – Abel Estanislao, actor and model
 May 21 – Diego Loyzaga, actor
 May 24 – Gladys Mae Dimaya, basketball player
 May 23 – Eula Caballero, actress
 June 1 – Nina Bernardine dela Cruz, medical student
 June 2 – Anton Asistio, basketball player
 June 4:
 Jerome Ponce, actor
 Kiko Estrada, actor
 June 15 – David Licauco, actor
 June 24 – Mark Stephen Loman, mixed martial artist and former MMA World Champion
 June 28 – Krizza Neri, singer
 July 18 – Phytos Ramirez, actor, TV commercial and model
 July 23 – James Wright, singer and recording artist
 July 26 – Kim Kianna Dy, volleyball player
 July 29:
 Jin Macapagal, actor, model, and dancer
 Kiray Celis, actress
 August 1 – Derrick Monasterio, actor, dancer and singer
 August 4 – Jessica Sanchez, American singer-songwriter of Mexican and Filipino ancestries and runner-up of American Idol Season 11
 August 7 – Tony Labrusca, actor
 August 18 – Jon Lucas, actor
 August 21 – Gil Cuerva, actor
 August 23 – Eliza Pineda, actress
 August 29 – Aria Clemente, actress and singer
 August 30 – Addy Raj, actor, singer, and model
 September 6 – John Manalo, actor
 September 15 – Rita Daniela, actress and singer
 September 19 – Rheena Villamor, news anchor and radio commentor
 September 23 – Seth Patrick Isay, actor and model
 September 24 – Gigi De Lana, actress and singer
 September 28 – Danny Kingad, mixed martial artist
 October 27 – Maika Rivera, actress and tennis player
 October 29 – Eumir Marcial, boxer
 November 1 – Andre Paras, actor and basketball player
 November 17 – Ernest John Obiena, pole vaulter
 November 22 – Gab Lagman, actor and model
 November 26 – Michael Pangilinan, singer-songwriter
 November 27 – Yohan Hwang, singer
 December 23 – Mond Abrilla, commercial model
 December 26 – Gazini Ganados, beauty queen

Deaths
 February 28 – Tito Espinosa, Masbate Representative
 March 8 – Ike Lozada, comedian, actor, and TV host (b. 1940)
 March 17 – Flor Contemplacion, household worker (b. 1953)
 April 22 – Honorato Perez, mayor of Cabanatuan
 April 28 – Wilfrido Ma. Guerrero, playwright, director, teacher and theater artist (b. 1911)
 May 11 – José T. Joya, Filipino abstract artist (b. 1931)
 June 11 – Rodel Naval, singer, songwriter and actor (b. 1953)
 June 24 – Eduardo Masferré, photographer (b. 1909)
 August 4 – Alejandro Almendras, senator (b. 1919)
 September 5 – Andy Poe, actor (b. 1943)
 September 30 – Nestor Redondo, comic book artist (b. 1928)
 December 9 – Eugene Barutag, Filipino boxer (b. 1976)
 December 11 – Leonardo Ty, Filipino-Chinese industrialist  (b. 1913)
 December 16 – Bert Marcelo, actor and comedian (b. 1936)
 December 18 – Panchito Alba, actor and comedian (b. 1925)

Unknown
 Carlos Magdaluyo, businessman (b. 1921)

References

 
1995 in Southeast Asia
Philippines
1990s in the Philippines
Years of the 20th century in the Philippines